USS Buena Ventura (ID-1329), also spelled USS Buenaventura, was a United States Navy cargo ship in commission in 1918 that was sunk during World War I.

Construction and early career, 1913-1918
Buena Ventura was built as a commercial cargo ship in 1913 at Howdon-on-Tyne, England, by Northumberland Shipbuilding Company. The United States Steel Products Company of New York City owned her when the United States Shipping Board requisitioned her for World War I service in 1917. The Shipping Board assigned her to the United States Army, for which she began operations in 1917 with a United States Navy Naval Armed Guard detachment aboard to man her guns.

United States Navy service, 1918
Buena Ventura was transferred to the U.S. Navy on 25 July 1918. Assigned the naval registry Identification Number (Id. No.) 1335, she was commissioned as USS Buena Ventura (or USS Buenaventura) at Philadelphia, Pennsylvania on 26 July 1918.

Buena Ventura was assigned to the Naval Overseas Transportation Service on a U.S. Army account. After loading cargo at Philadelphia, she departed for New York City on 9 August 1918, then left New York in a convoy on 13 August 1918 bound for France. Steaming first to La Pallice and from there to Royan and Bordeaux, she proceeded to Le Verdon-sur-Mer to take on fuel for the return voyage to Philadelphia.

Buena Ventura cleared Le Verdon-Sur-mer in ballast on 14 September 1918 as part of a 25-ship convoy bound for the United States. Seven escorts protected the convoy until that evening, after which the convoy continued across the Atlantic Ocean unescorted.

Loss
At about 20:45 on 16 September 1918, the German submarine U-46 came across the unescorted convoy and fired two torpedoes into Buena Ventura. The blast from the explosion coursed upward, splintering the lifeboat suspended in its davits just above and knocking the wireless out of commission. The second torpedo hit in the after end of the empty hold number four.

Buena Ventura, mortally stricken, soon slowed in the rising swells, listing to port. Her siren blasted out the submarine warning signal while her after gun fired one shot. After throwing the confidential publications and codes overboard in weighted bags, the crew abandoned their rapidly sinking ship in the four undamaged lifeboats. Her commanding officer – Lt. Cdr. Fitzsimons – remained on board to be sure that everyone who could abandon ship had done so and, when thus assured, stepped into the last boat and ordered it lowered away. That boat, damaged in bumping against the side of the ship due to the Buena Venturas port list, required unceasing efforts to bale out the water that had gained entry through several leaks. Fitzsimons, his executive officer, and the 27 enlisted men in the boat, separated from the other three boats in the darkness and rising seas, steered in the direction of the Spanish coast.

On 18 September, the French destroyer  rescued 45 of Buena Venturas crew, while on the morning of 20 September, the Spanish coaster Lola took Fitzsimons and his remaining sailors on board and landed them at Corunna, Spain on 22 September.

Casualties 
Three officers and 15 or 16 enlisted men died in the loss of Buena Ventura.

References 

Department of the Navy: Naval Historical Center Online Library of Selected Images: Civilian Ships: S.S. Buenaventura (American Freighter, 1913). Served as USS Buenaventura (ID # 1335) in 1918. Name also spelled Buena Ventura
NavSource Online: Section Patrol Craft Photo Archive: Buena Ventura (ID 1335)

 

World War I cargo ships of the United States
Ships built on the River Tyne
Ships sunk by German submarines in World War I
1913 ships
Cargo ships of the United States Navy
World War I shipwrecks in the Atlantic Ocean
Maritime incidents in 1918